Linda M. Waggoner is an independent researcher and author whose work focuses on Native American history and anthropology. She has written about Red Wing, William Henry Dietz (reporting that he passing as Native American), the Ho-Chunk Nation of Wisconsin, and Angel De Cora.

Waggoner and her work has been featured in the San Antonio, New Mexico, ESPN.com, History Nebraska, the Baltimore Sun, The Washington Post, and on Twin Cities PBS.

Career 
Her work around William Henry Dietz is considered important in increasing interest in the Native American mascot controversy. She has been a guest lecturer at the Wisconsin Historical Society, National Museum of the American Indian and the Grace Hudson Museum. She is a former lecturer in Multicultural Studies at Sonoma State University.

Personal life 
Waggoner lives in California.

Selected works
Starring Red Wing! : The Incredible Career of Lilian M. St. Cyr, the First Native American Film Star. Lincoln: Bison Books/University of Nebraska Press (2019). 
"On Trial: The Washington R*dskins' Wily Mascot: Coach William "Lone Star" Deitz". Montana The Magazine of Western History (2013). 
Fire Light: The Life of Angel De Cora, Winnebago Artist. Norman: University of Oklahoma Press (2008). 
Editor. "Neither White Men Nor Indians": Affidavits from the Winnebago Mixed-blood Claim Commissions, Prairie Du Chien, Wisconsin, 1838–1839. Roseville: Park Genealogical Books (2002).

References

Further reading
Benjey, Tom. Keep A-goin': The Life of Lone Star Dietz. Brentwood: Tuxedo Press (2006). 
Clemmons, Linda M. Dakota in Exile: The Untold Stories of Captives in the Aftermath of the U.S.-Dakota War. Iowa City: University of Iowa Press (2019). 

Living people
21st-century American women writers
American women historians
People from Healdsburg, California
Sonoma State University faculty
Writers from California
Year of birth missing (living people)
Historians from California